Syriakata Hassan Diallo (born 17 April 1989) is a Chadian footballer who plays as a centre-back for Chadian club Foullah Edifice. He has represented the Chad national team between 2006 and 2011.

Career statistics

International
Scores and results list Chad's goal tally first.

See also
 List of Chad international footballers

References

External links
 

1989 births
Living people
Chadian footballers
People from Bol, Chad
Association football central defenders
Renaissance FC players
Foullah Edifice FC players
Linafoot players
Chad international footballers